Simmes is the surname of the following people
Daniel Simmes (born 1966), German football manager and player
Misty Blue Simmes (born 1959), American professional wrestler
Valentine Simmes (fl. 1585 – 1622), English printer
William Simmes (c. 1575 – c. 1625), English composer and musician

See also
Simme, river in canton of Bern, Switzerland